Épinard (1920–1942) was a French Thoroughbred racehorse and sire.

Background
Epinard was a chestnut stallion owned and bred by Pierre Wertheimer.

He sired by Badajoz from Epine Blanche by the British Triple Crown winner Rock Sand. Epine Blanche was conceived in the U.S.A. and foaled in France. She was out of an American mare named White Thorn by Nasturtium, who was a brilliant two-year-old. Epine Blanche was also the dam of the race winner Epinette III by Mont Bernina. Épinard was inbred to the undefeated racehorse, St. Simon in the third and fourth generation (4m x 4f).

Racing career
Épinard made his racing debut at two by winning the Prix Yacowlef at the Deauville Racecourse. He dominated his age group in France, winning four important races and earning 1922 champion honours. As a three-year-old, he continued to win in France before being sent to compete in England. At the Goodwood Racecourse near Chichester, he won the 1923 Stewards' Cup, defeating a strong field including Pharos. After conceding a great deal of weight, he finished second by a neck to Verdict in the Cambridgeshire Handicap.

In October 1923, Epsom Derby winner Papyrus was sent to the United States to compete in a much-ballyhooed match race against Kentucky Derby winner Zev. After the American horse easily won, the following year the racing world began to talk about Épinard taking on America's best. Following negotiations with leading American horsemen August Belmont Jr., James Shevlin, and Matt Winn, Wertheimer agreed to send Épinard to compete in a series of three American races billed as the International Special.

The races were to be held at Belmont Park and Aqueduct Racetrack in New York and at Latonia Race Track in Kentucky; it was the first time Épinard raced on a dirt track. He finished second in all three of the International Specials. Épinard's 1924 performances earned him U.S. Champion Older Male Horse honours, although he lost all four times he ran in America. The fourth race was his last career start, the Laurel Stakes, when he finished fifth to Special #1 winner Wise Counsellor.

Stud record
Retired to stand at stud after his four-year-old season, Épinard had limited success as a sire. In 1926, he was standing in the US, and two years later he returned to France. In 1930, he made another trip to America only to return to France in 1932.

His progeny included Epithet (won Hopeful Stakes), Rentenmark (won Prix Ganay) and Rodosto Épinard was reportedly commandeered during the German occupation of France, and was last seen as a cart horse before he died in 1942.

References

1920 racehorse births
1942 racehorse deaths
Thoroughbred family 4-i
Racehorses bred in France
Racehorses trained in France
Racehorses trained in the United States
American Champion racehorses
Byerley Turk sire line